Libran may refer to:
 A person with the Libra astrological sign
 , a civil parish in Baleira, Galicia, Spain
 Librán , a settlement in Toreno, León, Spain
 Libran N. Cabactulan (born 1950), Filipino diplomat and ambassador
 Frankie Librán (1948–2013), Puerto Rican athlete and baseball infielder
 Julie de Libran (born 1972), French fashion designer

See also 
 Libra (disambiguation)